Tenby Cottage Hospital is a community hospital in Tenby, Wales. It is managed by the Hywel Dda University Health Board.

History
The hospital has its origins in a cottage hospital which opened at Trafalgar Road in Tenby in 1871. It moved to modern facilities in Gas Lane, which were officially opened by Brian Gibbons, Minister for Health and Social Services in the Welsh Assembly Government, in June 2006.

References

NHS hospitals in Wales
Hospitals in Pembrokeshire
Hospitals established in 1871
Hospital buildings completed in 2006
Hywel Dda University Health Board
1871 establishments in Wales